Lynn Margulis (born Lynn Petra Alexander; March 5, 1938 – November 22, 2011) was an American evolutionary biologist, and was the primary modern proponent for the significance of symbiosis in evolution. Historian Jan Sapp has said that "Lynn Margulis's name is as synonymous with symbiosis as Charles Darwin's is with evolution." In particular, Margulis transformed and fundamentally framed current understanding of the evolution of cells with nuclei – an event Ernst Mayr called "perhaps the most important and dramatic event in the history of life" – by proposing it to have been the result of symbiotic mergers of bacteria. Margulis was also the co-developer of the Gaia hypothesis with the British chemist James Lovelock, proposing that the Earth functions as a single self-regulating system, and was the principal defender and promulgator of the five kingdom classification of Robert Whittaker.

Throughout her career, Margulis' work could arouse intense objection (one grant application elicited the response, "Your research is crap. Don't ever bother to apply again.") and her formative paper, "On the Origin of Mitosing Cells", appeared in 1967 after being rejected by about fifteen journals. Still a junior faculty member at Boston University at the time, her theory that cell organelles such as mitochondria and chloroplasts were once independent bacteria was largely ignored for another decade, becoming widely accepted only after it was powerfully substantiated through genetic evidence. Margulis was elected a member of the US National Academy of Sciences in 1983. President Bill Clinton presented her the National Medal of Science in 1999. The Linnean Society of London awarded her the Darwin-Wallace Medal in 2008.

Called "science's unruly earth mother", a "vindicated heretic", or a scientific "rebel", Margulis was a strong critic of neo-Darwinism. Her position sparked lifelong debate with leading neo-Darwinian biologists, including Richard Dawkins, George C. Williams, and John Maynard Smith. Margulis' work on symbiosis and her endosymbiotic theory had important predecessors, going back to the mid-19th century – notably Andreas Franz Wilhelm Schimper, Konstantin Mereschkowski, Boris Kozo-Polyansky, and Ivan Wallin – and Margulis, not only promoted greater recognition for their contributions, but personally oversaw the first English translation of Kozo-Polyansky's Symbiogenesis: A New Principle of Evolution, which appeared the year before her death. Many of her major works, particularly those intended for a general readership, were collaboratively written with her son Dorion Sagan.

In 2002, Discover magazine recognized Margulis as one of the 50 most important women in science.

Biography
Lynn Margulis was born in Chicago, to a Jewish, Zionist family. Her parents were Morris Alexander and Leona Wise Alexander. She was the eldest of four daughters. Her father was an attorney who also ran a company that made road paints. Her mother operated a travel agency. She entered the Hyde Park Academy High School in 1952, describing herself as a bad student who frequently had to stand in the corner.

A precocious child, she was accepted at the University of Chicago Laboratory Schools at the age of fifteen. In 1957, at age 19, she earned a BA from the University of Chicago in Liberal Arts. She joined the University of Wisconsin to study biology under Hans Ris and Walter Plaut, her supervisor, and graduated in 1960 with an MS in genetics and zoology. (Her first publication, published with Plaut in 1958 in the Journal of Protozoology, was on the genetics of Euglena, flagellates which have features of both animals and plants.) She then pursued research at the University of California, Berkeley, under the zoologist Max Alfert. Before she could complete her dissertation, she was offered research associateship and then lectureship at Brandeis University in Massachusetts in 1964. It was while working there that she obtained her PhD from the University of California, Berkeley in 1965. Her thesis was An Unusual Pattern of Thymidine Incorporation in Euglena. In 1966 she moved to Boston University, where she taught biology for twenty-two years. She was initially an Adjunct Assistant Professor, then was appointed to Assistant Professor in 1967. She was promoted to Associate Professor in 1971, to full Professor in 1977, and to University Professor in 1986. In 1988 she was appointed Distinguished Professor of Botany at the University of Massachusetts at Amherst. She was Distinguished Professor of Biology in 1993. In 1997 she transferred to the Department of Geosciences at Amherst to become Distinguished Professor of Geosciences "with great delight", the post which she held until her death.

Personal life 
Margulis married astronomer Carl Sagan in 1957 soon after she got her bachelor's degree. Sagan was then a graduate student in physics at the University of Chicago. Their marriage ended in 1964, just before she completed her PhD. They had two sons, Dorion Sagan, who later became a popular science writer and her collaborator, and Jeremy Sagan, software developer and founder of Sagan Technology. In 1967, she married Thomas N. Margulis, a crystallographer. They had a son named Zachary Margulis-Ohnuma, a New York City criminal defense lawyer, and a daughter Jennifer Margulis, teacher and author. They divorced in 1980. She commented, "I quit my job as a wife twice," and, "it's not humanly possible to be a good wife, a good mother, and a first-class scientist. No one can do it — something has to go." In the 2000s she had a relationship with fellow biologist Ricardo Guerrero. Her sister Joan Alexander married Nobel Laureate Sheldon Glashow; another sister, Sharon, married mathematician Daniel Kleitman.

She was a religious agnostic, and a staunch evolutionist, but rejected the modern evolutionary synthesis, and said: "I remember waking up one day with an epiphanous revelation: I am not a neo-Darwinist! I recalled an earlier experience, when I realized that I wasn't a humanistic Jew. Although I greatly admire Darwin's contributions and agree with most of his theoretical analysis and I am a Darwinist, I am not a neo-Darwinist." She argued that "Natural selection eliminates and maybe maintains, but it doesn't create", and maintained that symbiosis was the major driver of evolutionary change.

In 2013, Margulis was listed as having been a member of the Advisory Council of the National Center for Science Education.

Margulis died on 22 November 2011 at home in Amherst, Massachusetts, five days after suffering a hemorrhagic stroke. As her wish, she was cremated and her ashes were scattered in her favorite research areas, near her home.

Contributions

Endosymbiosis theory

In 1966, as a young faculty member at Boston University, Margulis wrote a theoretical paper titled "On the Origin of Mitosing Cells". The paper, however, was "rejected by about fifteen scientific journals," she recalled. It was finally accepted by Journal of Theoretical Biology and is considered today a landmark in modern endosymbiotic theory. Weathering constant criticism of her ideas for decades, Margulis was famous for her tenacity in pushing her theory forward, despite the opposition she faced at the time. The descent of mitochondria from bacteria and of chloroplasts from cyanobacteria was experimentally demonstrated in 1978 by Robert Schwartz and Margaret Dayhoff. This formed the first experimental evidence for the symbiogenesis theory. The endosymbiosis theory of organogenesis became widely accepted in the early 1980s, after the genetic material of mitochondria and chloroplasts had been found to be significantly different from that of the symbiont's nuclear DNA.

In 1995, English evolutionary biologist Richard Dawkins had this to say about Lynn Margulis and her work:
I greatly admire Lynn Margulis's sheer courage and stamina in sticking by the endosymbiosis theory, and carrying it through from being an unorthodoxy to an orthodoxy. I'm referring to the theory that the eukaryotic cell is a symbiotic union of primitive prokaryotic cells. This is one of the great achievements of twentieth-century evolutionary biology, and I greatly admire her for it.

Symbiosis as evolutionary force

Margulis opposed competition-oriented views of evolution, stressing the importance of symbiotic or cooperative relationships between species.

She later formulated a theory that proposed symbiotic relationships between organisms of different phyla, or kingdoms, as the driving force of evolution, and explained genetic variation as occurring mainly through transfer of nuclear information between bacterial cells or viruses and eukaryotic cells. Her organelle genesis ideas are now widely accepted, but the proposal that symbiotic relationships explain most genetic variation is still something of a fringe idea.

Margulis also held a negative view of certain interpretations of Neo-Darwinism that she felt were excessively focused on competition between organisms, as she believed that history will ultimately judge them as comprising "a minor twentieth-century religious sect within the sprawling religious persuasion of Anglo-Saxon Biology."
She wrote that proponents of the standard theory "wallow in their zoological, capitalistic, competitive, cost-benefit interpretation of Darwin – having mistaken him ... Neo-Darwinism, which insists on [the slow accrual of mutations by gene-level natural selection], is in a complete funk."

Gaia hypothesis

Margulis initially sought out the advice of James Lovelock for her own research: she explained that, "In the early seventies, I was trying to align bacteria by their metabolic pathways. I noticed that all kinds of bacteria produced gases. Oxygen, hydrogen sulfide, carbon dioxide, nitrogen, ammonia—more than thirty different gases are given off by the bacteria whose evolutionary history I was keen to reconstruct. Why did every scientist I asked believe that atmospheric oxygen was a biological product but the other atmospheric gases—nitrogen, methane, sulfur, and so on—were not? 'Go talk to Lovelock,' at least four different scientists suggested. Lovelock believed that the gases in the atmosphere were biological."

Margulis met with Lovelock, who explained his Gaia hypothesis to her, and very soon they began an intense collaborative effort on the concept. One of the earliest significant publications on Gaia was a 1974 paper co-authored by Lovelock and Margulis, which succinctly defined the hypothesis as follows: "The notion of the biosphere as an active adaptive control system able to maintain the Earth in homeostasis we are calling the 'Gaia hypothesis.'"

Like other early presentations of Lovelock's idea, the Lovelock-Margulis 1974 paper seemed to give living organisms complete agency in creating planetary self-regulation, whereas later, as the idea matured, this planetary-scale self-regulation was recognized as an emergent property of the Earth system, life and its physical environment taken together. When climatologist Stephen Schneider convened the 1989 American Geophysical Union Chapman Conference around the issue of Gaia, the idea of "strong Gaia" and "weak Gaia" was introduced by James Kirchner, after which Margulis was sometimes associated with the idea of "weak Gaia", incorrectly (her essay "Gaia is a Tough Bitch" dates from 1995 – and it stated her own distinction from Lovelock as she saw it, which was primarily that she did not like the metaphor of Earth as a single organism, because, she said, "No organism eats its own waste"). In her 1998 book Symbiotic Planet, Margulis explored the relationship between Gaia and her work on symbiosis.

Five kingdoms of life
In 1969, life on earth was classified into five kingdoms, as introduced by Robert Whittaker. Margulis became the most important supporter, as well as critic – while supporting parts, she was the first to recognize the limitations of Whittaker's classification of microbes. But later discoveries of new organisms, such as archaea, and emergence of molecular taxonomy challenged the concept. By the mid-2000s, most scientists began to agree that there are more than five kingdoms. Margulis became the most important defender of the five kingdom classification. She rejected the three-domain system introduced by Carl Woese in 1990, which gained wide acceptance. She introduced a modified classification by which all life forms, including the newly discovered, could be integrated into the classical five kingdoms. According to Margulis, the main problem, archaea, falls under the kingdom Prokaryotae alongside bacteria (in contrast to the three-domain system, which treats archaea as a higher taxon than kingdom, or the six-kingdom system, which holds that it is a separate kingdom). Margulis' concept is given in detail in her book Five Kingdoms, written with Karlene V. Schwartz. It has been suggested that it is mainly because of Margulis that the five-kingdom system survives.

Controversies
It has been suggested that initial rejection of Margulis' work on the endosymbiotic theory, and the controversial nature of it as well as Gaia theory, made her identify throughout her career with scientific mavericks, outsiders, and unaccepted theories generally. In the last decade of her life, while key components of her life's work began to be understood as fundamental to a modern scientific viewpoint – the widespread adoption of Earth System Science and the incorporation of key parts of endosymbiotic theory into biology curricula worldwide – Margulis if anything became more embroiled in controversy, not less. Journalist John Wilson explained this by saying that Lynn Margulis "defined herself by oppositional science," and in the commemorative collection of essays Lynn Margulis: The Life and Legacy of a Scientific Rebel, commentators again and again depict her as a modern embodiment of the "scientific rebel", akin to Freeman Dyson's 1995 essay, The Scientist as Rebel, a tradition Dyson saw embodied in Benjamin Franklin, and which Dyson believed to be essential to good science. At times, Margulis could make highly provocative comments in interviews that appeared to support her most strident critics' condemnation. The following describes three of those controversies.

Metamorphosis theory 
In 2009, via a then-standard publication-process known as "communicated submission" (which bypassed traditional peer review), she was instrumental in getting the Proceedings of the National Academy of Sciences (PNAS) to publish a paper by Donald I. Williamson rejecting "the Darwinian assumption that larvae and their adults evolved from a single common ancestor." Williamson's paper provoked immediate response from the scientific community, including a countering paper in PNAS. Conrad Labandeira of the Smithsonian National Museum of Natural History said, "If I was reviewing [Williamson's paper] I would probably opt to reject it," he says, "but I'm not saying it's a bad thing that this is published. What it may do is broaden the discussion on how metamorphosis works and [...] [on] the origin of these very radical life cycles." But Duke University insect developmental biologist Fred Nijhout said that the paper was better suited for the "National Enquirer than the National Academy." In September it was announced that PNAS would eliminate communicated submissions in July 2010. PNAS stated that the decision had nothing to do with the Williamson controversy.

AIDS/HIV theory 
In 2009 Margulis and seven others authored a position paper concerning research on the viability of round body forms of some spirochetes, "Syphilis, Lyme disease, & AIDS: Resurgence of 'the great imitator'?" which states that, "Detailed research that correlates life histories of symbiotic spirochetes to changes in the immune system of associated vertebrates is sorely needed", and urging the "reinvestigation of the natural history of mammalian, tick-borne, and venereal transmission of spirochetes in relation to impairment of the human immune system". The paper went on to suggest "that the possible direct causal involvement of spirochetes and their round bodies to symptoms of immune deficiency be carefully and vigorously investigated".

In a Discover Magazine interview, which was published less than six months before her death, Margulis explained to writer Dick Teresi her reason for interest in the topic of 2009 "AIDS" paper: "I'm interested in spirochetes only because of our ancestry. I'm not interested in the diseases", and stated that she had called them "symbionts" because both the spirochete which causes syphilis (Treponema) and the spirochete which causes Lyme disease (Borrelia) only retain about 20% of the genes they would need to live freely, outside of their human hosts.

However, in the Discover Magazine interview Margulis said that "the set of symptoms, or syndrome, presented by syphilitics overlaps completely with another syndrome: AIDS", and also noted that Kary Mullis said that "he went looking for a reference substantiating that HIV causes AIDS and discovered, 'There is no such document' ".

This provoked a widespread supposition that Margulis had been an "AIDS denialist". Notably Jerry Coyne reacted on his Why Evolution is True blog against his interpretation that Margulis believed "that AIDS is really syphilis, not viral in origin at all." Seth Kalichman, a social psychologist who studies behavioral and social aspects of AIDS, cited her [Murgulis] 2009 paper as an example of AIDS denialism "flourishing", and asserted that her [Margulis] "endorsement of HIV/AIDS denialism defies understanding".

9/11 "Truth"

Margulis argued that the September 11 attacks were a "false-flag operation, which has been used to justify the wars in Afghanistan and Iraq as well as unprecedented assaults on [...] civil liberties." She claimed that there was "overwhelming evidence that the three buildings [of the World Trade Center] collapsed by controlled demolition."

Awards and recognitions
 Elected Fellow of the American Association for the Advancement of Science in 1975.
 Guggenheim Fellowship in 1978.
 Elected to the National Academy of Sciences in 1983.
 Guest Hagey Lecturer, University of Waterloo, 1985
 Miescher-Ishida Prize in 1986.
 1989, conferred the Commandeur de l’Ordre des Palmes Académiques de France.
 Has her papers permanently archived in the Library of Congress, Washington, DC.
 1992, recipient of Chancellor's Medal for Distinguished Faculty of the University of Massachusetts at Amherst.
 1995, elected Fellow of the World Academy of Art and Science.
 1997, elected to the Russian Academy of Natural Sciences.
 1998, recipient of the Distinguished Service Award of the American Institute of Biological Sciences.
 1998, elected Fellow of the American Academy of Arts and Sciences.
 1999, recipient of the William Procter Prize for Scientific Achievement.
 1999, recipient of the National Medal of Science, awarded by President William J. Clinton.
 2001, Golden Plate Award of the American Academy of Achievement
 2002–05, Alexander von Humboldt Prize.
 2005, elected President of Sigma Xi, The Scientific Research Society.
 Profiled in Visionaries: The 20th Century's 100 Most Important Inspirational Leaders, published in 2007.
 Founded Sciencewriters Books in 2006 with her son Dorion.
 Was one of thirteen recipients in 2008 of the Darwin-Wallace Medal, heretofore bestowed every 50 years, by the Linnean Society of London.
 2009, speaker at the Biological Evolution Facts and Theories Conference, held at the Pontifical Gregorian University, Rome aimed at promoting dialogue between evolutionary biology and Christianity.
 2010, inductee into the Leonardo da Vinci Society of Thinking at the University of Advancing Technology in Tempe, Arizona.
 2010, NASA Public Service Award for Astrobiology.
 2012, Lynn Margulis Symposium: Celebrating a Life in Science, University of Massachusetts, Amherst, March 23–25, 2012
 2017, the Journal of Theoretical Biology 434, 1–114 commemorated the 50th anniversary of "The origin of mitosing cells" with a special issue
 Honorary doctorate from 15 universities.

Works

Books
 Margulis, Lynn (1970). Origin of Eukaryotic Cells, Yale University Press, 
 Margulis, Lynn (1982). Early Life, Science Books International, 
 Margulis, Lynn, and Dorion Sagan (1986). Origins of Sex : Three Billion Years of Genetic Recombination, Yale University Press, 
 Margulis, Lynn, and Dorion Sagan (1987). Microcosmos: Four Billion Years of Evolution from Our Microbial Ancestors, HarperCollins, 
 Margulis, Lynn, and Dorion Sagan (1991). Mystery Dance: On the Evolution of Human Sexuality, Summit Books, 
 Margulis, Lynn, ed. (1991). Symbiosis as a Source of Evolutionary Innovation: Speciation and Morphogenesis, The MIT Press, 
 
 Margulis, Lynn (1992). Symbiosis in Cell Evolution: Microbial Communities in the Archean and Proterozoic Eons, W.H. Freeman, 
 Sagan, Dorion, and Margulis, Lynn (1993). The Garden of Microbial Delights: A Practical Guide to the Subvisible World, Kendall/Hunt, 
 Margulis, Lynn, Dorion Sagan and Niles Eldredge (1995) What Is Life?, Simon and Schuster, 
 Margulis, Lynn, and Dorion Sagan (1997). Slanted Truths: Essays on Gaia, Symbiosis, and Evolution, Copernicus Books, 
 Margulis, Lynn, and Dorion Sagan (1997). What Is Sex?, Simon and Schuster, 
 Margulis, Lynn, and Karlene V. Schwartz (1997). Five Kingdoms: An Illustrated Guide to the Phyla of Life on Earth, W.H. Freeman & Company, 
 Margulis, Lynn (1998). Symbiotic Planet : A New Look at Evolution, Basic Books, 
 Margulis, Lynn, et al. (2002). The Ice Chronicles: The Quest to Understand Global Climate Change, University of New Hampshire, 
 Margulis, Lynn, and Dorion Sagan (2002). Acquiring Genomes: A Theory of the Origins of Species, Perseus Books Group, 
 Margulis, Lynn (2007). Luminous Fish: Tales of Science and Love, Sciencewriters Books, 
 Margulis, Lynn, and Eduardo Punset, eds. (2007). Mind, Life and Universe: Conversations with Great Scientists of Our Time, Sciencewriters Books, 
 Margulis, Lynn, and Dorion Sagan (2007). Dazzle Gradually: Reflections on the Nature of Nature, Sciencewriters Books,

Journals

Explanatory notes

References

External links

 
 
 
 
 
 
 
 
 

1938 births
2011 deaths
20th-century American biologists
20th-century American women scientists
20th-century American zoologists
21st-century American women scientists
21st-century American zoologists
21st-century biologists
American agnostics
American biologists
American people of Jewish descent
American women biologists
Boston University faculty
Carl Sagan
Evolutionary biologists
Jewish women scientists
Lyme disease researchers
Members of the United States National Academy of Sciences
National Medal of Science laureates
Sagan family
Scientists from Massachusetts
Symbiogenesis researchers
Symbiosis
Theoretical biologists
University of California, Berkeley alumni
University of Chicago Laboratory Schools alumni
University of Massachusetts Amherst faculty
University of Wisconsin–Madison College of Letters and Science alumni
Women evolutionary biologists
Women zoologists